Within the earth science of geology, the Edmonton Group is a Late Cretaceous (Campanian stage) to early Paleocene stratigraphic unit of the Western Canada Sedimentary Basin in the central Alberta plains. It was first described as the Edmonton Formation by Joseph Burr Tyrrell in 1887 based on outcrops along the North Saskatchewan River in and near the city of Edmonton. E.J.W. Irish later elevated the formation to group status and it was subdivided into four separate formations. In ascending order, they are the Horseshoe Canyon, Whitemud, Battle and Scollard Formations. The Cretaceous-Paleogene boundary occurs within the Scollard Formation, based on dinosaurian and microfloral evidence, as well as the presence of the terminal Cretaceous iridium anomaly.

Distribution and thickness 
The Edmonton Group is present in the central plains of Alberta. It consists of sedimentary rocks that were deposited in nonmarine to brackish water environments between the Canadian Rockies in the west and the Western Interior Seaway to the east. Its reaches a maximum thickness of  near the foothills of the Rockies in the west, and thins eastward to zero at its erosional edge east of Edmonton.

Lithology 
The Edmonton Group consists of fine-grained sandstones, calcareous sandstones, siltstones, sandy shales and mudstones, bentonitic sandstones and shales, bentonite beds, ironstone concretions, carbonaceous shales and coal seams. Hard sandstones commonly cap mesas, buttes and plateaus where erosion has formed badlands topography, as is the case for much of the Horseshoe Canyon Formation and the Scollard Formation. Coarse-grained sediments are rare in the Edmonton Group.

Paleontology 
Plant fossils are common in both the Late Cretaceous and early Paleocene portions of the Edmonton Group. Remains of Triceratops and other dinosaurs are found in the Late Cretaceous portion, especially the Horseshoe Canyon Formation and the lower part of the Scollard Formation. Molluscs such as Ostrea and Unio are found in both portions.

Relationship to other units 
The Edmonton Group is disconformably overlain by the Paskapoo Formation and conformably overlies the Bearpaw Formation or, where the Bearpaw is absent, the Belly River Formation.

The Edmonton Group grades into the sequence of the Blood Reserve Formation, St. Mary River Formation and Willow Creek Formation in the southern Alberta plains; into the upper part of the Wapiti Group in the northern Alberta and northeastern British Columbia; and into the upper part of the Brazeau Formation and the Coalspur Formation in the foothills of the Canadian Rockies. It is equivalent to, but not contiguous with, the Eastend Formation, Whitemud Formation, Battle Formation and Frenchman Formation in the Cypress Hills of southeastern Alberta and southwestern Saskatchewan; and with the Fox Hills Formation in Saskatchewan.

Formations that are stratigraphically equivalent in the western United States are the Horsethief Formation in Montana; the Fox Hills Formation and Lance Formation in Montana; and the Lennup Formation and Muteetse Formation in Wyoming.

Subdivisions 
The formations of the Edmonton Group are:

See also 

 List of fossiliferous stratigraphic units in Alberta
 Coalspur Formation

References 

Geologic groups of North America
Geologic formations of Canada
Western Canadian Sedimentary Basin
Cretaceous Alberta
Paleogene Alberta
Paleocene North America
Cretaceous–Paleogene boundary